Calothamnus villosus, commonly known as woolly net-bush or silky net-bush, is a plant in the myrtle family, Myrtaceae and is endemic to the south-west of Western Australia. It is a tall shrub, often forming thickets. It has thin, cylindrical leaves and blood red flowers for many months of the year. It is superficially similar to Calothamnus quadrifidus but can be distinguished from that species by its flowers which have five stamen claws compared to the four of C. quadrifidus.

Description
The leaves are arranged alternately, linear and needle-like.

They have 5 sepals that are densely hairy on their outer surface. Flowering occurs from March to December and is followed by fruits which are smooth, woody, approximately spherical capsules with two prominently thickened lobes at the top.

Taxonomy and naming
Calothamnus villosus was first formally described in 1812 by Robert Brown in William Aiton's Hortus Kewensis. The specific epithet (villosus) is a Latin word meaning "hairy".

Distribution and habitat
Calothamnus villosus occurs from Albany to Esperance in the Esperance Plains and Mallee biogeographic regions. It is most common in the Cape Le Grand National Park and in the Mount Burdett Nature Reserve. It usually grows in thickets on sand, gravel or over granite.

References

 Christoper Brickell (Editor-in-chief): RHS A-Z Encyclopedia of Garden Plants. Third edition. Dorling Kindersley, London 2003, .

External links

villosus
Endemic flora of Western Australia
Myrtales of Australia
Plants described in 1812
Taxa named by Robert Brown (botanist, born 1773)